Kissinger and Nixon is a 1995 American drama film directed by Daniel Petrie and written by Lionel Chetwynd. It is based on the 1992 book Kissinger: A Biography by Walter Isaacson. The film stars Ron Silver, Beau Bridges, Ron White, George Takei, Kenneth Welsh and Tony Rosato. The film premiered on TNT on December 10, 1995.

Plot

Cast 
Ron Silver as Henry Kissinger
Beau Bridges as Richard Nixon
Ron White as H. R. Haldeman
George Takei as Lê Đức Thọ
Kenneth Welsh as James Reston
Tony Rosato as Charles Colson 
Henry Chan as Nguyễn Văn Thiệu
Matt Frewer as Alexander Haig 
Tom Tran as Nbo
Ping-Yu Chang as Political advisor
Adrian Hough as Lord
Paul Miller as Negreponte
Ron Hartmann as Ellsworth Bunker
Brett Halsey as William P. Rogers
Graham McPherson as William Westmoreland
Barbara Radecki as Muriel

References

External links
 

1995 television films
1995 films
1995 drama films
TNT Network original films
Films directed by Daniel Petrie
American drama television films
1990s English-language films
1990s American films